The SS Cliffs Victory was a cargo vessel, originally built as a Victory ship, during World War II, as the  Notre Dame Victory and operated by Interocean Shipping Company under charter with the Maritime Commission and War Shipping Administration.  In 1950 she was lengthened and converted to a lake freighter for the Cleveland-Cliffs Inc.

History

U.S. Navy 
The ship was built in 1945 by Oregon Shipbuilding Company in Portland, Oregon. She had been mothballed, following her brief World War II service, and, when the Korean War required more vessels on the Great Lakes, she was purchased by Cleveland Cliffs, who planned to adapt her for service on the Lakes.  According to Mark Thompson, author of Queen of the Lakes, these plans triggered skepticism. But the conversion took only 90 days.

Great Lakes service 
Her adaptation left her with a unique profile. Her original bridge and central superstructure were removed and a new bridge and accommodation was built in the bow, as with all other lake freighters. Her engines were left midships, and the second superstructure, that other lake freighters had above their engines, in the stern was built above her engines in their midship locations. But unlike every other lake freighter she still had holds abaft her engine rooms.

She was towed from the yard where she was converted, in Baltimore, Maryland to Chicago, Illinois, and special provisions had to be made so she could travel under the bridges she encountered.  She passed under one bridge with only five inches of clearance.

At  she was too long for the final lock on the Chicago Sanitary and Ship Canal.  The lockmaster agreed for her bow to be tied in place, right up against the upstream doors to the lock, with her stern sticking out of the open lower doors.  He then opened the upstream doors, and the vessel was hauled upstream far enough for the downstream doors to be closed.

When she was lengthened a second time, in 1957, by a further , she became "Queen of the Lakes" –the longest ship on the Great Lakes.

On December 21, 1971 large machinery damage discovered. The estimated cost of repairs was $100,000. On April 20, 1975 Cliffs Victory collided with the SS. Benson Ford while attempting to break the latter vessel free from ice. SS. Cliffs Victory went into Fraser Shipyards for port bow repairs and was returned to service on April 24. On December 9, 1976 the ship ran aground near Johnson Point in the St. Marys River while downbound in heavy ice conditions. Cliffs Victory was freed on December 11. The incident later became known as the "worst traffic jam in the river in fifty years", with about seventy vessels delayed by the incident. Assistance of three tugs and a Coast Guard icebreaker required to free Cliffs Victory. During the resulting inspection, it was discovered that the rudder had been lost in the incident.

Retirement 
In 1985, her registry was changed to Panama and was briefly renamed SS Savic. She was sold for scrap the same year to Hai International Corp. in Taiwan.

References

Merchant ships of the United States
Queen of the Lakes
Victory ships
1945 ships
Ships built in Portland, Oregon